Project One was an art gallery and lounge located in San Francisco, California's design district, which showcased the work of new contemporary artists and hosted both new and established DJs in a  converted warehouse space, featuring a sound system and bar.

In 2009 Deborah Schoeneman of The New York Times praised the gallery for what she called its "devoted and eclectic clientele" and ambiance.

References

Defunct art museums and galleries in California
Culture of San Francisco